Cochrane's Craft, which is also known as Cochranianism, is a form of traditional witchcraft founded in 1951 by the English witch Robert Cochrane, who himself claimed to have been taught in the tradition by some of his elderly family members, a claim that is disputed by some historians such as Ronald Hutton and Leo Ruickbie.

Despite numerous practical and theological similarities to other forms of modern witchcraft, such as Gardnerian Wicca, Cochrane's Craft sets itself apart from other traditions in many notable ways, such as its emphasis on the pursuit of wisdom as the highest goal of witchcraft and Cochrane's insistence that witchcraft is not Pagan and, in fact, has no more in common with Paganism than does Qabbalah.

History
Around the time that the British Witchcraft Act 1735 was repealed in 1951, and it became legal to practice witchcraft in the United Kingdom, Cochrane, who was in his early twenties, founded a coven, and named it the Clan of Tubal Cain after the biblical figure Tubal-cain (the first blacksmith), as a reference to his work in that profession. At first, he had tried to work with Gardner, but broke with him on creative differences. This created a rivalry that continued through Gardner's death.

Cochrane initiated his wife Jane and several others into the craft, and they then joined the coven. Among these was Evan John Jones, who would one day replace Robert Cochrane as the Magister of the Clan of Tubal Cain. Jones had met Cochrane through his wife Jane, as they both worked for the same company. The group performed their rituals either at Cochrane's house, or, more often, at Burnham Beeches, though they also performed rituals at the South Downs, after which they would stay the night at Doreen Valiente's flat in Brighton.

According to Kelden, Doreen Valiente, after the schism with Garderner, joined Cochrane in 1964 contributing to the bulk of Cochrane's "Traditional Witchcraft" as she had to Wicca. 

In 1966, Robert Cochrane died. Jane, Robert's widow, then named Jones as the Magister of the Clan of Tubal Cain.

In 1982, two Americans named Dave & Ann Finnin reached out to Gray and Jones. In 1986, after four years of correspondence, Jones adopted the Finnins into the Clan of Tubal Cain and named them Magister and Maid of a satellite group called The Roebuck. Conflicts later arose between Jones and the Finnians, and he ceased communications with the couple In 1996, Mike Howard, editor of The Cauldron, introduced Jones to a woman named Shani Oates. In 1998, Jones felt Oates to be the best person to lead the Clan of Tubal Cain and formally named her its Maid, giving her "supreme and undivided authority over the whole Clan". Oates then named as her Magister Robin the Dart. On the Winter Solstice 2017, Oates appointed Ulric Goding as Magister of the Clan, as the successor to lead the Clan to future generations. 

Describing Cochrane's creation of his Witchcraft tradition, Oates remarked that "Like any true craftsman, he was able to mold raw material into a magical synthesis, creating a marvelous working system, at once instinctively true and intrinsically beautiful."

Beliefs

Theology
As in most forms of Neopagan Witchcraft, Cochranians worship both a Horned God and a Triple Goddess. The Goddess is viewed as the White Goddess, a term taken from Robert Graves' poem, The White Goddess.  She is also viewed as a triad of three mothers or three sisters, which both Cochrane and Evan John Jones noted as having similarities with the weird sisters or Norns of Germanic paganism.

In Cochrane's Craft, the God is associated with fire, the underworld and time, and has been described as "the goat-god of fire, craft, lower magics, fertility and death". The God was known by several names, most notable Tubal Cain, Brân, Wayland and Herne. Cochrane's tradition held that these two deities had a son, the Horn Child, who was a young sun god.

Cochrane, like Gardner, believed that there was a being beyond the God and the Goddess; the Godhead, although he referred to this deity as "the Hidden Goddess". He also referred to it as "Truth".

Cochrane told of a cosmogony myth, which involved Night, "a feminine being with force, but without form, giving birth to man and with him she discovered love, and so all things began". He said that the Elder Gods had seven children who each created a realm to rule over from a castle, as well as creating the elements of earth, air, fire and water, each of which had a god ruling over it.

Ethics and morality
No mention is made in Cochrane's writings to the Wiccan Rede or "Threefold Law". Cochrane instead offers an "old witch 'law'" that reads:

In a letter to occultist William G. Gray, Cochrane said:

Practices
Cochranians wear robes whilst performing rituals and adhere to the traditional Great Rite.

Tools
An iconic part of Cochrane's Craft is the tool known as the stang. A stang is a forked staff used, primarily, as a portable altar. In The Roebuck in the Thicket, Evan John Johns describes the acquisition and adornment of a stang intended for use by a coven. According to Jones, the shaft of the stang should be made from ash; the fork of the stang should be made of iron; the base should be shod in iron; two upward-facing crossed arrows should adorn the shaft below the fork; and, on the four "Great Sabbats" (i.e. Candlemas, May Eve, Lammas, and Halloween), the arrows should be garlanded as fits the season. The stang is similar to the tool described in Buckland's Scottish Witchcraft, but Cochrane is credited with being the first witch to use one.

Media
In 2015 a feature film, The Coven was released based on the premise that "Robbie Cochrane founded a Wicca coven as recently as the 1960s" and that followers were meeting in Queen's Wood in Highgate. A Cochranian devotee, Uri Clef, is killed and the film's plot reveals the killer in a subtle and complex story line.

See also
1734 Tradition
Gardnerian Wicca

References

Modern pagan traditions
Wicca in the United Kingdom
1950s in modern paganism